Arthur James Tait (8 November 1872 – 3 April 1944) was an eminent Anglican priest and author.

Tait was educated at St Lawrence College, Ramsgate; Merchant Taylors' School, London; St John's College, Cambridge and Ridley Hall, Cambridge. After a curacy at of Holy Trinity Church, Eastbourne he was Principal of St Aidan's College, Birkenhead from 1901 until 1907; and then of Ridley Hall, Cambridge from 1908 to 1927. He was a Canon Residentiary of Peterborough from 1924 until his death.

His father in law was The Rt Rev. Thomas Wortley Drury, D.D. His daughter Margaret married the university administrator Bertrand Hallward.

References

1872 births
1944 deaths
People educated at St Lawrence College, Ramsgate
People educated at Merchant Taylors' School, Northwood
Alumni of St John's College, Cambridge
Alumni of Ridley Hall, Cambridge
Staff of Ridley Hall, Cambridge